Marcelo Miranda (born October 10, 1961) is an ex-governor of the Brazilian state of Tocantins.  He is a member of the Brazilian Democratic Movement.

References

1961 births
Living people
Governors of Tocantins
Brazilian Democratic Movement politicians
Place of birth missing (living people)
21st-century Brazilian politicians